Júlio Tavares (born 19 November 1988) is a Cape Verdean footballer who plays as a striker for Saudi Professional League club Al-Raed and the Cape Verde national team.

Club career

Dijon
On 28 October 2017, Tavares became Dijon's all time leading goal scorer after heading in the only goal in the 1–0 Ligue 1 home victory over Nantes; it was his 56th goal for Dijon in all competitions and broke the previous Dijon record of 55 goals scored in all competitions held by Sebastián Ribas. On 18 November 2017, Tavares scored twice in the 3–1 Ligue 1 home win over Troyes; it was the first Ligue 1 brace of his career and his second goal was the 100th Ligue 1 goal scored by Dijon, playing in just their third season in Ligue 1. On 10 February 2018, Tavares scored twice as Dijon came from behind to beat OGC Nice 3–2 in a home Ligue 1 match; his brace brought his 2017–18 Ligue 1 goal tally to 9 in 15 matches, as many as he had scored in 35 Ligue 1 matches during the entire 2016–17 season.

Al-Faisaly
On 14 September 2020, Tavares signed with Saudi Professional League club Al-Faisaly.

Al-Raed
On 25 July 2022, Tavares joined Al-Raed on a free transfer.

International career
In 2013, he played in all matches at 2013 Africa Cup of Nations, where his team advanced to the quarterfinals, in the best result in the history of the national team.

Career statistics

Club

International goals
Scores and results list Cape Verde's goal tally first.

Honours

Club
Al-Faisaly
King Cup: 2020–21
Individial
King Cup Top goalscorer: 2020–21

References

External links

1988 births
Living people
Association football forwards
Cape Verdean footballers
Cape Verde international footballers
People from São Nicolau, Cape Verde
2013 Africa Cup of Nations players
Football Bourg-en-Bresse Péronnas 01 players
Dijon FCO players
Al-Faisaly FC players
Al-Raed FC players
Ligue 1 players
Ligue 2 players
Championnat National 2 players
Saudi Professional League players
Cape Verdean expatriate footballers
Expatriate footballers in France
Expatriate footballers in Saudi Arabia
Cape Verdean expatriate sportspeople in France
Cape Verdean expatriate sportspeople in Saudi Arabia
2015 Africa Cup of Nations players
2021 Africa Cup of Nations players